Sirens is a British comedy-drama about an ambulance service team, broadcast on Channel 4. It was first screened on 27 June 2011.

The series is based on the book Blood, Sweat & Tea by Brian Kellett. The series is filmed predominantly in Leeds with some filmed in the surrounding areas. Locations featured including Headingley, Kirkstall, Adel, Hyde Park, Cookridge, Chapel Allerton and the main city centre including shopping areas of Briggate and Headrow.

On 17 October 2011, Rhys Thomas and Channel 4 confirmed that there would not be a second series.

In November 2013, USA Network revealed it was airing an American version of the show, which ran for two seasons from 2014 to 2015 before being canceled.

Main cast
 Rhys Thomas as Stuart Bayldon, a talented Emergency Medical Technician. He has intimacy issues that Maxine believes stem from his estranged father.
 Richard Madden as Ashley Greenwick, Stuart's best friend and co-worker. He is gay, but does not like discussing it with Rachid.
 Kayvan Novak as Rachid Mansaur, the trainee on Stuart and Ashley's team. He pushes Ashley's buttons.
 Amy Beth Hayes as Sgt Maxine Fox, Stuart's other best friend.

Minor cast
 Ben Batt as Craig Scruton, the fireman.
 Morven Christie as Kirsty Schelmerdine, the hospital therapist
 Kobna Holdbrook-Smith as Ryan Bailey, Maxine's colleague.
 Annie Hulley as Stella Woodvine, paramedic (Stuart, Ashley & Rachid's boss).
 Tuppence Middleton as Sarah Fraisor, Rachid's girlfriend.
 Robert Stone as Fat Carl, a fellow paramedic.

Episodes

Home release
A DVD of Sirens was released on 12 March 2012.

A book called Sirens (written by Tom Reynolds) was released on 25 July 2011, following the day-to-day life blogs of members of the emergency services.

US remake
USA Network ordered a remake of the show before it even premiered in UK. Denis Leary developed the project and co-wrote it with Bob Fisher. They're also executive producers of the show alongside Jim Serpico, Hal Vogel and David Aukin.

References

External links

2011 British television series debuts
2011 British television series endings
2010s British comedy-drama television series
2010s British medical television series
2010s British LGBT-related comedy television series
2010s British LGBT-related drama television series
2010s British workplace comedy television series
2010s British workplace drama television series
Channel 4 comedy dramas
English-language television shows
Television shows set in Leeds